Jocelyn Marcel Guèvremont (born March 1, 1951) is a Canadian former professional ice hockey defenceman who played nine seasons in the National Hockey League (NHL). He featured in the 1975 Stanley Cup Finals with the Buffalo Sabres.

He began his career as a distinguished junior ice hockey player, named to the Ontario Hockey Association (OHA) Second and First All-Star Teams in consecutive years and was awarded the Max Kaminsky Trophy in 1971 as the most outstanding defenceman in the OHA. He also won the 1969 and 1970 Memorial Cup. Drafted in the first round, third overall by the Vancouver Canucks in the 1971 NHL Amateur Draft, Guèvremont spent parts of his nine-year NHL career with the Canucks, the Buffalo Sabres, and the New York Rangers. He has also suited up for the Montreal Junior Canadiens of the OHA and the New Haven Nighthawks of the American Hockey League (AHL).

Playing career
In his NHL career he played for the Vancouver Canucks, Buffalo Sabres, and New York Rangers and retired in 1980 due to chronic shoulder problems. He was also a member of Team Canada at the 1972 Summit Series.  As a Buffalo Sabre he was often the only defenceman on the powerplay due to their depth at right wing, which pushed Rene Robert back to the other point while Danny Gare lined up on the wing along with Gilbert Perreault and Rick Martin.  Although he was not a big goal scorer his hard slap shot resulted in many tip goals on the power play.  At full strength he often was paired with Bill Hajt.

Awards
1970 – OHA Second All-Star Team
1971 – OHA First All-Star Team
1971 – Max Kaminsky Trophy
1974 – Played in NHL All-Star Game

Career statistics

Coaching record

External links

1951 births
Living people
Buffalo Sabres players
Canadian ice hockey defencemen
Cornwall Royals (OHL) coaches
Drummondville Voltigeurs coaches
Ice hockey people from Montreal
Montreal Junior Canadiens players
National Hockey League All-Stars
National Hockey League first-round draft picks
New Haven Nighthawks players
New York Rangers players
Vancouver Canucks draft picks
Vancouver Canucks players
Canadian ice hockey coaches